Sai Lokur (born 5 September 1989) is an Indian actress. She made her debut with the Hindi movie Kuch Tum Kaho Kuch Hum Kahein as a child artist. She was seen in Kis Kisko Pyaar Karoon alongside Kapil Sharma. She appeared in Bigg Boss Marathi 1 as a contestant and made it in top 5 finalists.

Personal life 
The actress married IT professional Tirthadeep Roy on 30 November 2020.

Filmography

Television

Web series

References

External links
 
 

Living people
1989 births
Indian film actresses
Bigg Boss Marathi contestants
People from Belgaum